Bérangère Couillard (born 24 July 1986) is a French politician of La République En Marche! (LREM) who has been serving as State Secretary for Ecology in the government of Prime Minister Élisabeth Borne since 2022. From the 2017 elections to 2022, she was a member of the French National Assembly, representing the department of Gironde.

Early life and education
Originally from Rennes, Couillard studied in Brittany, Paris and Ireland.

Political career
In the National Assembly, Couillard served as member of the Committee on Sustainable Development and Spatial Planning. In addition to her committee assignments, she represented the parliament on the Higher Council for Energy (CSE). Within her parliamentary group, she co-chaired (alongside Guillaume Gouffier-Cha) a working group on fighting domestic violence.

Political positions
In April 2018, Couillard joined other co-signatories around Sébastien Nadot in officially filing a request for a commission of inquiry into the legality of French weapons sales to the Saudi-led coalition fighting in Yemen, days before an official visit of Saudi Crown Prince Mohammed bin Salman to Paris.

In May 2018, Couillard co-sponsored an initiative in favour of legalizing assisted reproductive technology (ART) for all women (singles, heterosexual couples or lesbian couples).

In July 2019, Couillard voted in favor of the French ratification of the European Union's Comprehensive Economic and Trade Agreement (CETA) with Canada.

References

1986 births
Living people
Deputies of the 15th National Assembly of the French Fifth Republic
La République En Marche! politicians
Women members of the National Assembly (France)
Politicians from Rennes
Politicians from Nouvelle-Aquitaine
Members of the Borne government
Women government ministers of France